Joint Functional Component Command for Integrated Missile Defense (JFCC IMD) is a component of United States Strategic Command (USSTRATCOM).  The current commander is Army Lieutenant General Daniel L. Karbler.

Mission
JFCC IMD was established to optimize planning, execution and force management, as directed by HQ USSTRATCOM, of deterring attacks against the United States, its territories, possessions and bases.  In addition, JFCC IMD would employ appropriate forces, should deterrence fail, and the associated mission of planning, integrating and coordinating global missile defense operations and support for missile defense.

Background
JFCC IMD originated in the Implemented Directive issued by the Commander, United States Strategic Command (USSTRATCOM) in January 2005.  The JFCCs were formed to further operationalize USSTRATCOM missions and allow the Headquarters, USSTRATCOM to focus on strategic-level integration and advocacy.  JFCC IMD is responsible for planning and coordinating global operations and support for integrated missile defense.  The JFCC IMD will conduct operational and tactical level planning and day-to-day employment of assigned and attached missile defense forces for USSTRATCOM integrated missile defense operations, to include integrated missile defense planning and operational support responsibilities with other combatant commands, the Missile Defense Agency and joint service components.  HQ USSTRATCOM will retain the responsibility for advocacy of system-level missile defense capabilities, integration of missile defense into strategic level planning and military assessments of missile defense capabilities.  Strategic Level Intelligence support will be provided by Defense Intelligence Agency’s Joint Intelligence Operations Center.

Current operations
JFCC-IMD is responsible for USSTRATCOM integrated missile defense planning and operational support to include operational and tactical level plan development, force execution and day-to-day management of assigned and attached missile defense forces. JFCC IMD is co-located with MDA at Schriever AFB. Current operation areas include:

Coordinate BMDS development and operational activity through the asset management process in conjunction with other applicable commands, agencies and organizations.
Focal point for global situational awareness of missile defense operations
Maintain visibility of all global missile defense logistics to aid the Commander and staff in planning and decision making
Coordinate and maintain intelligence, as necessary, to support missile defense components.
Provide operational oversight for the Command, Control, Battle Management and Communications system.
Develop course of action recommendations to optimize global integrated missile defense operations, address operational resource conflicts, operational seams and vulnerabilities, and minimize operational risk for missile defense capabilities.
Plan and coordinate BMDS objectives for Joint and Combatant Command exercises, wargames and experiments.

The Joint Ballistic Missile Defense Education and Training Center (JBMDETC) is now a Joint Center of Excellence. JBMDETC is operated by JFCC IMD at Schriever Space Force Base, Colorado. Established as part of the Missile Defense Agency in 2005, it was transferred to JFCC IMD in 2013.

Resources
USSTRATCOM Factsheet on JFCC IMD
U.S. Space and Missile Defense Command's 2022 Global Defender

See also
U.S. Army Space and Missile Defense Command

References

United States Strategic Command